Brookwood High School is a public secondary school in Snellville, Georgia, in suburban Atlanta, part of the Gwinnett County School System. Brookwood serves several areas of southern Gwinnett County, including Snellville, Lawrenceville, and Lilburn.

History
Planning for Brookwood High School was started in 1977 to lessen the overcrowding of nearby South Gwinnett High School and Parkview High School. A committee of educators from Gwinnett County met to create and discuss specifications for the facility. The school officially opened in 1981 under principal Emmett Lawson.

The school derived its name from its location on the intersection of Holly Brook Road (a section of this road is now Webb Gin House Road) and Dogwood Road. The school colors, maroon and gold, were based on the colors of Florida State University. The original school mascot had a horseshoe around the bronco, which was later removed. The administration had suggested that Brookwood be the Brookwood Bears.  The original mascot was a drawing of an entire bronco, but the current logo uses only a bronco's head. The runner-up mascot choice was the Bruins, and the second place color scheme was baby blue and gold.

Athletics

Club sports
Brookwood hosts club sports including the Inferno Ultimate Frisbee Team and ice hockey. These teams compete against other high schools and in tournaments.

Extracurriculars

Literary and debate
Brookwood was the 1999 AAAA State Literary Champion and the 2006 AAAAA State Debate Champion.

Math Team
For several years in a row, the Brookwood High School Math Team has been invited to attend the Georgia Council of Teachers of Mathematics State Tournament.

Music
The school's marching band has won many awards and trophies. The band has been invited to perform in the 2023 Rose Parade in Pasadena, California.

School publications
The Brookwood High student paper, The Sentinel, features school, political, and entertainment articles. The publication was discontinued after the 2019-2020 school year due to lack of support.

The yearbook, also student-run, is called Cayuse. A literature club produces a yearly magazine, Pegasus, which is released alongside the yearbook. The magazine features short stories, essays, songs, and poetry written and submitted by students. The publication was discontinued later on.

Science Olympiad
Brookwood High School's Science Olympiad team has won the Georgia State Tournament twelve times, from 2008-2009, 2011-2019, and 2021-2022.

Feeder schools
Brookwood is the high school of the Brookwood cluster, a group of schools which feed into one primary high school for an area in Gwinnett County. The middle schools that feed into Brookwood are Alton C. Crews Middle School and Five Forks Middle School. Crews Middle has two elementary school feeders, Brookwood Elementary (which is located next door to Brookwood High) and Craig Elementary. Five Forks Middle has students from RD Head Elementary and Gwin Oaks Elementary, along with some students from Brookwood and Craig Elementary.

Notable alumni
 Robby Bostain (born 1984) – American-Israeli basketball player
 Jason Bulger – former MLB pitcher
 Rennie Curran – football player
 Jason Elam – retired NFL placekicker
 Jennifer Ferrin – Daytime Emmy-nominated actress, As the World Turns
 Joe Gebbia - Co-founder of Airbnb
 Stephon Heyer – former NFL lineman
 Jamie Howe - Broadcast sports reporter
 Sean Johnson - Major League Soccer goalkeeper
 Michael Kelly – Emmy award-nominated actor
 Cameron Lynch - NFL football player
 Nick Moore - football player
 Cedric Mullins - Major League Baseball player
 Amy Robach – anchor of ABC's Good Morning America
 Lucas Sims - Major League Baseball pitcher
 Troy Snitker - MLB hitting coach
 Amanda Weir –  Olympic swimmer
 Mansfield Wrotto – NFL football player
 Walker Zimmerman - Major League Soccer player

References

External links
 Brookwood High School
 Gwinnett County Public Schools

Public high schools in Georgia (U.S. state)
Schools in Gwinnett County, Georgia
1981 establishments in Georgia (U.S. state)
Educational institutions established in 1981